Lieutenant-General John Home Home was an officer of the British Army.

Biography
He was the son of John Home, a captain in the Army, who inherited the estate of Bassendean from a cousin, and his wife Mary, née Mackay. Home served as commanding officer of the Grenadier Guards, and acted as lieutenant-governor and commander-in-chief in Nova Scotia. He was also colonel of the 56th Regiment of Foot. He died at his lodgings in Pall Mall, London on 22 April 1860, aged sixty-three. He had no children, and was succeeded by his nephew, John Hutcheson Fergusson (son of James Fergusson and Mary Home), who adopted the name and arms of Home in addition to Fergusson.

References

1790s births
1860 deaths
People from Berwickshire
British Army lieutenant generals
Grenadier Guards officers
56th Regiment of Foot officers